Antoni Giedrys (born 17 January 1954) is a Polish football manager.

References

1954 births
Living people
Polish football managers
Polonia Warsaw managers
Hutnik Warsaw managers